The Fuzhou–Pingtan railway is a railway line in China. It opened on 26 December 2020.

The railway is the first to serve Pingtan Island, which it accesses via the Pingtan Strait Road-Rail Bridge. It is part of Beijing–Taipei high-speed rail corridor.

History
Construction began on 31 October 2013.

Stations
The line has the following stations:
Fuzhou
Fuzhou South
Changle
Changle East
Changle South
Pingtan

References

Railway lines in China
Railway lines opened in 2020